Muhammad Taufany Muslihuddin (born 24 March 2002) is an Indonesian professional footballer who plays as a midfielder for Liga 1 club Borneo Samarinda.

Club career

Borneo Samarinda
He was signed for Borneo Samarinda to play in Liga 1 in the 2022 season. Taufany made his league debut on 19 December 2022 in a match against RANS Nusantara at the Manahan Stadium, Surakarta.

Career statistics

Club

References

External links
 Taufany Muslihuddin at Soccerway
 Taufany Muslihuddin at Liga Indonesia

2002 births
Living people
Indonesian footballers
Association football midfielders
Liga 1 (Indonesia) players
Borneo F.C. players